is a Japanese women's professional shogi player ranked 7-dan. In May 2017, Shimizu became the first woman to be elected as an executive director to the Japan Shogi Association's board of directors.

Early life
Shimizu was born on January 9, 1969, in Higashimurayama, Tokyo. In 1983, she won the 15th Amateur Women's Meijin Tournament while she was a junior high school student. That same year, she entered the Japan Shogi Association's Women's Professional Apprentice League under the guidance of shogi professional . She achieved the rank of women's professional 2-kyū in April 1985, thus becoming the first apprentice to graduate from the Women's Professional Apprentice League system.

Women's shogi professional
In October 2000, Shimizu became the first women's professional to be promoted to the rank of women's 6-dan.

In November 2016, Shimizu defeated Tomomi Kai in a women's meijin league game to become the second women's professional to win 600 official games.

, Shimizu's career record versus male professionals in official games is 29 wins and 156 losses.

Promotion history
Shimizu has been promoted as follows.
 2-kyū: April 1, 1985
 1-dan: January 17, 1986
 2-dan: September 21, 1987
 3-dan: February 8, 1988
 4-dan: April 1, 1992
 5-dan: April 1, 1995
 6-dan: October 1, 2000
 7-dan: April 1, 2020
Note: All ranks are women's professional ranks.

Titles and other championships
Shimizu has appeared in major title matches a total of 70 times and has won a total of 43 titles. She has won the Women's Meijin title ten times, the  title nine times, the  title fourteen times and the  ten times. In addition to major titles, Shimizu has won 11 other shogi championships.

Major titles

Other championships

Note: Tournaments marked with an asterisk (*) are no longer held or currently suspended.

Awards and honors
Shimizu has received a number of Japan Shogi Association Annual Shogi Awards and other awards in recognition of her accomplishments in shogi and contributions made to Japanese society.

Annual Shogi Awards
15th Annual Awards (April 1987March 1988): Women's Professional Award
19th Annual Awards (April 1991March 1992): Women's Professional Award
21st Annual Awards (April 1993March 1994): Women's Professional Award
22nd Annual Awards (April 1994March 1995): Women's Professional Award
23rd Annual Awards (April 1995March 1996): Women's Professional Award
24th Annual Awards (April 1996March 1997): Women's Professional Award, Special Award
25th Annual Awards (April 1997March 1998): Women's Professional Award
26th Annual Awards (April 1998March 1999): Women's Professional Award
28th Annual Awards (April 2000 — March 2001): Women's Professional of the Year
29th Annual Awards (April 2001 — March 2002): Women's Professional Award
31st Annual Awards (April 2003 — March 2004): Women's Professional of the Year
32nd Annual Awards (April 2004 — March 2005): Women's Professional of the Year
35th Annual Awards (April 2007 — March 2008): Women's Professional of the Year
36th Annual Awards (April 2008 — March 2009): Women's Professional of the Year 
37th Annual Awards (April 2009 — March 2010): Women's Professional of the Year
38th Annual Awards (April 2010 — March 2011): Women's Professional Most Games Played
39th Annual Awards (April 2011 — March 2012): Women's Professional Award, Women's Professional Most Games Played
42nd Annual Awards (April 2014 — March 2015): Women's Professional Most Games Played

Other awards
1996, June: Minister of Education Award
1997, February: Tokyo Resident Culture Honor Award (Awarded by the Governor of Tokyo in recognition of cultural achievements by a Tokyoite)
2000, November: Higashimurayama, Tokyo Resident Honor Award
2008, August: Kurashiki Shogi Culture Honor Award
2009: 25 Years Service Award (Awarded by the JSA in recognition of being an active professional for twenty-five years)

JSA director
In May 2017, Shimizu became the first women to be elected as an executive director to the Japan Shogi Association's board of directors. She was re-elected to a second two-year term in June 2019.

References

External links
 ShogiHub: Professional Player Info · Shimizu, Ichiyo 

1969 births
Japanese shogi players
Living people
Women's professional shogi players
People from Higashimurayama, Tokyo
Professional shogi players from Tokyo Metropolis
Women's Meijin
Women's Ōshō
Women's Ōi
Kurashiki Tōka Cup